Joseph G. Hakobyan (born 28 August 1931) is a Russian scientist. He is an expert on missiles development. He was the Deputy General of the Moscow Research Institute. 

Hakobyan was born in Saratov, Russia.

External links

 Акопян Иосиф Григорьевич — Биография на сайте наукограда «Жуковский» 
 Генеральный конструктор из Жуковского — статья к 80-летию Акопяна в газете «Авиаград Жуковский» 
 Биография Иосифа Григорьевича Акопяна 
 Акопян Иосиф Григорьевич — Энциклопедия космонавтики 
 «АГАТ» учит летать ракеты — «Грани успеха» 
 Акопян Иосиф Григорьевич — Центр военно-политических исследований 

1931 births
Living people
Scientists from Saratov
Golden Idea national award winners
Tikhomirov Scientific Research Institute of Instrument Design employees